Ithycythara acutangulus is a species of sea snail, a marine gastropod mollusk in the family Mangeliidae.

Description
The length of the shell attains 7.5 mm, its diameter 2.5 mm.

(Original description) The white shell has an elongate subfusiform shape. 
This species is remarkable for the acute angulations of the eight whorls, the spiral liration at the angle, and the purplish-red bands at the suture and the middle of the body whorl, the latter being visible within the aperture, which measures about ⅓ of the total length. The number of ribs appears to vary from seven to eight; and they are not quite regularly continuous from the apex downwards. The outer lip is incrassate and hardly sinuate. The siphonal canal is narrow and very short.

Distribution

References

External links
  Bouchet P., Kantor Yu.I., Sysoev A. & Puillandre N. (2011) A new operational classification of the Conoidea. Journal of Molluscan Studies 77: 273–308 
  Tucker, J.K. 2004 Catalog of recent and fossil turrids (Mollusca: Gastropoda). Zootaxa 682:1–1295.

acutangulus
Gastropods described in 1882